Upper Perkiomen High School is a public high school in Pennsburg in Montgomery County, Pennsylvania. It is part of the Upper Perkiomen School District.

External links

Schools in Montgomery County, Pennsylvania
Public high schools in Pennsylvania